Party-list Coalition Foundation, Inc. (PCFI), also known as the Party-list Coalition, is a coalition of representatives of political organizations with party-list representation in the House of Representatives, the lower house of the bicameral Congress of the Philippines.

The organization was founded in 2014 and is registered as a corporation with the Securities and Exchange Commission.

The Coalition are currently aligned with National Unity Party.

Representation in the Congress

17th Congress
Shortly prior to the start of the 17th Congress, the PCFI expressed support for then-President presumptive Rodrigo Duterte and his preferred candidate for the position of House Speaker Pantaleon Alvarez who was later elected to the position by his fellow legislators and served until 2018 when he was succeeded by Gloria Macapagal Arroyo.

It held at least 32 positions within the House of Representatives in May 2019.

18th Congress
In May 2019, the PCFI elected Mikee Romero of 1-Pacman Partylist as its leader. The organization under Romero renewed calls for equal treatment of partylist representatives perceiving that district representatives were favored to serve in positions within the House of Representatives.
Among the 61 party-list representatives from 51 organizations, 54 seats belongs to PCFI affiliated legislators. The other legislators are affiliated to the Makabayan bloc and the Magdalo Partylist.

19th Congress
The PCFI managed to secure commitment from 60 partylist legislators for the upcoming 19th Congress. The Makabayan bloc like in the previous Congress refused to affiliate with the PCFI.

Member parties

As of the 18th Congress (2019–2022)

 Resigned on July 25, 2019.
 Took office on November 4, 2019.
 Took office on October 13, 2020.

External links

References

Political party alliances in the Philippines
2014 establishments in the Philippines
Party-list representation in the House of Representatives of the Philippines